Guéthary is a commune in the Pyrénées-Atlantiques department in southwestern France. It is located in the traditional Basque province of Labourd, the town traditionally standing on the northernmost coastal linguistic boundary of the Basque language. Guéthary station has rail connections to Hendaye, Bayonne and Bordeaux.

History
Guéthary has existed as a small fishing village since the early 12th century. It became famous for hunting whales in the 13th century. The linguist Henri Gavel put down the name of the town to the Gascon word getari, 'post for watching' (the whales), while this assumption has been disputed by current linguists, who ultimately trace the name back to Latin caetaria (via Basque), 'fish processing facility', as supported by archaeological evidence unearthed both in Guéthary and the same name Getaria from Gipuzkoa.

See also
Communes of the Pyrénées-Atlantiques department
The works of Maxime Real del Sarte

References

External links

 Tourism office website
 Town council website (in French)
 GETARIA in the Bernardo Estornés Lasa - Auñamendi Encyclopedia (Euskomedia Fundazioa) (in Spanish)
 Is This The Most Beautiful Place To Retire In Europe?
 Guéthary, France: Secret Seaside

Communes of Pyrénées-Atlantiques
Pyrénées-Atlantiques communes articles needing translation from French Wikipedia
Populated coastal places in France